Obada Prize is an international award supported by  the Natural Sciences Publishing and African Academy of Sciences (North African Branch). It was established to recognise the excellence of Egyptian Mathematics Emeritus Professor, Obada Abdel Shafy. The award aims to identify creative interdisciplinary research that cuts across traditional boundaries. It also aims at encouraging values and excellence that can promote the humanistic scientific and technological breakthrough that can improve our world.

Obada-Prize award categories 
Obada-Prize involves three categories and they are; Distinguished Researcher, Young Distinguished Researchers (who are aged 40 or below) and the undergraduate and Post Graduate Students.

Obada Prize ceremony 
At the Obada Prize Ceremony, the winners are given Certificates, Obada-Prize Medal and a  document showing the Obada-Prize amount which can be used as a waver code for the publication fees in NSP International Journals.

List of Obada prize award winners

2022

Distinguished Researchers' Category

Sohail Nadeem,  a Professor of Mathematics at Quaid-i-Azam University, Pakistan.

Xiao-Jun Yang,  a professor of Applied Mathematics and Mechanics at China University of Mining and Technology, China.

Gehad G. Mohamed, a professor at the Chemistry Department, Cairo University.

Sheref El-Khamisy, a professor of Molecular Medicine at the University of Sheffield, UK.

Nageh Allam  ,  a Professor and Director of the Nanotechnology Graduate Program, American University, Egypt.

Ayman Abdel-Khalik,  a Professor of Electrical Engineering Department, Faculty of Engineering, Alexandria University

Amir Gandomi, a Professor of Data Science and an ARC DECRA Fellow at University of Technology Sydney, Australia.

References 

Award ceremonies